The list of New School people includes notable students, alumni, faculty, administrators and trustees of the New School. The New School is a private university located in New York City that offers degrees and diplomas in seventy one programs and majors in its eight colleges. Approximately 53,000 living New School alumni reside in more than 112 countries.

Alumni

World leaders

Hage Geingob, 3rd President of The Republic of Namibia
Shimon Peres, President of Israel, Nobel Peace Prize recipient
Eleanor Roosevelt, political activist; First Lady; United Nations Human Rights Prize recipient

Academics

Stanley Aronowitz, B.A., 1968, sociologist
Nelson Barbosa, Ph.D., economist, ex Brazil's Minister of Finance
Ruth Benedict, psychological anthropologist, author of Patterns of Culture
Peter L. Berger, sociologist; co-author of The Social Construction of Reality
Heather Boushey, Ph.D., economist
Jean L. Cohen, Ph.D., political theorist
Barbara A. Cornblatt, Ph.D., M.B.A., psychologist
Uri Davis, M.A. anthropology, 1973
Eugene Goossen, art critic and historian
Richard Grathoff, Ph.D. 1969, sociologist
Eduard Heimann (1889–1967), economist and social scientist
Mady Hornig, psychiatrist
Stephen Kinsella Ph.D., economist
Abraham Maslow, psychologist, a founder of Humanistic Psychology
Kevin Mattson, historian and political analyst
George E. McCarthy, M.A., Ph.D., sociologist
Sidney Mintz, anthropologist
Franco Modigliani, Soc. Sci. D., economist; 1985 Nobel Prize in Economics winner
Richard Noll, clinical psychologist and writer
Ira Progoff, Ph.D. psychology, psychotherapist
Franklin Delano Roosevelt, III, Ph.D., economist
Yossi Sarid, M.A. political science, journalist
Steven Seidman, sociologist
Michael Wenger, M.A., Zen priest, Dean of Buddhist Studies, San Francisco Zen Center
Ruth Westheimer, M.A. sociology, 1959, the first famous sex therapist, born Karola Siegel, 1928; known as "Dr. Ruth", German-American, also talk show host, author, professor, Holocaust survivor, and former Haganah sniper.
Nelson Ikon Wu, M.A. art historian, author of Song Never to End

Athletes

 Nate Fish (born 1980), baseball player and coach
 Nicole Ross (born 1989), Olympic foil fencer

Businesspeople
Douglas Cliggott, chief investment strategist, JPMorgan Chase
Stewart Krentzman, President & CEO Oki Americas, Inc.
Dolly Lenz, New York real estate agent
Bernard L. Schwartz
Bradford Shellhammer, entrepreneur and designer, founding editor of Queerty
Brian Willison

Writers

James Baldwin, Go Tell It on the Mountain
Anatole Broyard, writer, literary critic
Mike Doughty
Lorraine Hansberry, playwright, A Raisin in the Sun, youngest Drama Desk Award winner in history
Andrew Hubner, novelist
 Travis Jeppesen
 Jack Kerouac, On the Road, forerunner of the Beat Generation
Jamaica Kincaid
Sam Lansky, author of The Gilded Razor and Broken People
Paul Levinson, author of The Silk Code, Locus Award winner, Best First Novel, 2000, and The Plot to Save Socrates
Leandra Medine, author of the blog Man Repeller
Mario Puzo, author of The Godfather, two-time Academy Award Winner, including Best Screenplay
Brother Sean Sammon, Superior General of the Marist Brothers
William Styron, Sophie's Choice, The Confessions of Nat Turner
Tennessee Williams, two-time Pulitzer Prize-winning playwright
Sean Wilsey, author of Oh the Glory of It All

Designers

 Hector Luis Bustamante, actor and graphic designer
 Philippe Cramer, furniture designer
 Herbert Muschamp, architectural critic
 Paul Rand (born Peretz Rosenbaum), art director and graphic designer
 Will Wright, creator of The Sims

Fashion designers

 Gilbert Adrian, costumer designer
 Bill Blass, President's Committee on the Arts and Humanities member; co-founder of Council of Fashion Designers of America
 Donald Brooks
 Angela Gisela Brown, former New York fashion designer, now known as Princess Angela of Liechtenstein
 Doo-Ri Chung, Swarovski's Perry Ellis Award winner
 Tom Ford, filmmaker and founder of the Tom Ford brand
 Prabal Gurung
 Lazaro Hernandez
 Marc Jacobs, fashion designer
 Elois Jenssen, costume designer for I Love Lucy
 Kevin Johnn, appeared on Project Runway
 Anand Jon, fashion designer; convicted serial rapist
Donna Karan, creator of the DKNY label
Reed Krakoff, creative director of Tiffany & Co. 
 Derek Lam
 Jillian Lewis, appeared on Project Runway
 Claire McCardell
 Raul Melgoza, fashion designer, former CE at LUCA LUCA
Isaac Mizrahi, four-time CDFA award winner
Zac Posen, fashion designer
 Sarah Phillips
 Patrick Robinson
Narciso Rodriguez
 Lela Rose
 Behnaz Sarafpour
 Willi Smith, fashion designer
 Peter Som
 Anna Sui
 Zang Toi
 Kay Unger
 Carmen Marc Valvo
 Alexander Wang, fashion designer for Michelle Obama and Ivana Trump
 Jason Wu, artist and fashion designer

Fine artists

 Kevin Appel, painter
 Rosemary Cove, sculptor
 Julio Rosado del Valle, painter
 Dorathy Farr, painter
 Jane Frank (Jane Schenthal), painter, mixed media artist, sculptor, advertising designer, illustrator
 Adolph Gottlieb, painter
 Julie Harvey, painter
 Edward Hopper, painter
 Jasper Johns, forerunner of pop art and minimalism
 Shirley Kaneda, painter, Guggenheim Fellow, National Endowment for the Arts Fellow
 Sol Kjøk, visual artist
 Dan Flavin, lighting artist
 Shigeko Kubota, vice chairman of Fluxus
 George Maciunas, founding member of Fluxus
 Yucef Merhi, visual artist and new media art pioneer
 Rob Pruitt, sculptor
 Norman Rockwell, painter; Presidential Medal of Freedom winner
 Gavin Spielman, painter and musician
 Roman Turovsky, painter and musician
 Julie Umerle, painter
 Storme Webber, interdisciplinary artist
 Ai Weiwei, filmmaker, installation artist and architectural designer
 Janise Yntema, painter

Illustrators and animators
 Peter DeSeve, illustrator and character designer
 Julia Gran, graphic designer and illustrator, children's book writer and illustrator
 Bessie Pease Gutmann, magazine and children's book illustrator in the early 1900s
 Hidekaz Himaruya, manga artist (Hetalia: Axis Powers, Chibi-san Date)
 Joel Resnicoff, commercial artist and fashion illustrator
 Brian Wood, graphic novelist, illustrator, designer
 Dan Yaccarino, children's book writer and illustrator

Musicians
 Rami Bar-Niv, pianist and composer
 Harry Belafonte, singer
 Kelly Chen, Hong Kong singer and actress
 Melora Creager
 Danielle de Niese, opera singer (lyric soprano)
 Ani DiFranco
 Mike Doughty, B.A. from Lang in poetry
 Ezinma, classical crossover violinist
 Robert Glasper, jazz pianist and Grammy-winning R&B artist
 Larry Goldings, jazz pianist and organist
 Larry Harlow, M.A. in Philosophy, salsa pioneer
 Yonghoon Lee, opera singer (tenor)
 Matisyahu (born Matthew Miller), 2002, reggae artist
 Brad Mehldau, jazz pianist and composer
 John Popper, singer/harmonica player for Blues Traveler
 Jake Shears
 Alex Skolnick, Trans-Siberian Orchestra, Testament and the Alex Skolnick Trio
 Sufjan Stevens, MFA, creative writing, 2000
 Marcus Strickland, jazz saxophonist
 Ronald Turini, pianist
 Roman Turovsky-Savchuk, composer, lutenist and painter
 Jimmy Urine
 David Woodard, conductor
 Ivan Yanakov, pianist
 Sean Yseult, bassist for White Zombie
 Daniel Zamir
 Michael Zager, music producer
 Wallice, indie pop musician

Photographers
David Attie, photographer
Jill Enfield
Ed Feingersh, photojournalist
 Ryan McGinley
 Steven Meisel, fashion photographer
 Stewart Shining, fashion photographer
Marion Post Wolcott

Actors, directors, and producers

Beatrice Arthur, theater and television actress, Tony Award winner, star of Maude and The Golden Girls
Sean Baker, director of The Florida Project
Harry Belafonte
Derrick Borte
Marlon Brando
T.V. Carpio, actress and singer
Bradley Cooper, Academy Award-nominated actor
Adrian Cronauer
Tony Curtis
Paul Dano, Little Miss Sunshine
 Matt Deitsch, film director and freelance photographer
 Deepti Divakar, Indian model, actress, writer, Femina Miss India World 1981
Elisa Donovan, Clueless and Sabrina the Teenage Witch
Jesse Eisenberg, The Social Network
Peter Falk, B.A. political science, Columbo
 Stacy Farber, actress, former Degrassi: The Next Generation cast member
Ben Gazzara
Jillian Hervey
Jonah Hill, Superbad
 Harry Hurwitz, film director and artist
 Adam Jasinski, winner of Big Brother 9
 Sun Lee, Miss Korea 2007
Karen Maine, director and screenwriter, Yes, God, Yes, Starstruck (2021 TV series)
Walter Matthau
 Charis Michelsen, actress
Olivia Palermo, New York socialite; MTV's The City co-star
Adam Pally, actor
Lauren Patten, actress
 Joel Schumacher, film director and producer
Kevin Smith, Clerks (did not graduate)
Rod Steiger, On The Waterfront
Elaine Stritch
Shih-Ching Tsou
Rob Weiss, kicked out of film program
Shelley Winters
 Rob Zombie (born Robert Cummings), musician, writer and director

Politicians
Medea Benjamin
Kevin Parker, New York State Senator
William Donohue, sociology, Catholic League president
Millicent Fenwick, editor, politician, diplomat
Abraham Foxman, director of Anti-Defamation League
Alice Mary Higgins, independent senator and member of the Irish Parliament
Janine Jackson, MA sociology, program director of Fairness and Accuracy in Reporting
Ellen Johnson, MA political science, president of American Atheists
Illir Deda, member of parliament of Kosovo and founder of The Alternative party.
Tinga Seisay, diplomat, pro-democracy activist
Vanessa Wruble, co-founder of The Women's March on Washington

Faculty

Past

 Janet Abu-Lughod
 Woody Allen
 Hannah Arendt (1906–1975), German-born American political philosopher, author, and Holocaust survivor
 W. H. Auden, British-American poet
 Jason Bateman
 Seth Benardete
Eugene Biel-Bienne (1902–1969), Austrian-born American painter
 Franz Boas
 André Breton
 Nathan Brody
 Laurie Halsey Brown
 William F. Buckley, Jr.
 Judith Butler
 John Cage
 Edmund Snow Carpenter
 Harry Cleaver
 Stanley Coren
 Henry Cowell
 Agnes de Lima, Director of Public Relations
 Jacques Derrida
 John Dewey
 Stanley Diamond
 W. E. B. Du Bois
 John Eatwell
Fritz Eichenberg (1901–1990), German-American illustrator and arts educator 
 Millicent Fenwick
 Sándor Ferenczi
Joel Fink, Associate Dean of Roosevelt University
Marvin Frankel
 Betty Friedan
 Erich Fromm (1900–1980), German social psychologist, psychoanalyst, sociologist, humanistic philosopher, and democratic socialist
 Robert Frost, poet
 Donna Gaines
 Alexander Goldenweiser
 David Gordon
 Hermann Grab
 Martha Graham
 Joseph Greenberg
 Aron Gurwitsch
 Jürgen Habermas
 Michael Harner
 Marcia Haufrecht, actress, playwright and director, as well as a noted acting teacher and coach
 Robert Heilbroner (1919–2005), economist and historian of economic thought
 Werner Hegemann (1881–1936), German-born city planner, architecture critic, and author
 Ágnes Heller (1929–2019), Hungarian philosopher and lecturer
 Christopher Hitchens
 Eric Hobsbawm
 Karen Horney
 Michael Hudson (born 1939), economics professor
 Roman Jakobson
 Hans Jonas, (1903–1993), German-born American philosopher, the Alvin Johnson Professor of Philosophy at the New School
 Horace Kallen (1882–1974), German-born American philosopher
 Ira Katznelson
 John Maynard Keynes
 Kenneth Koch
 Julia Kristeva
 Ernesto Laclau
 Emil Lederer
 Emanuel Levenson
 Paul Levinson
 Claude Lévi-Strauss (1908–2009), French anthropologist and ethnologist
 Adolph Lowe
 Ernest Mandel
 Everett Dean Martin
 Bohuslav Martinů
 Margaret Mead
 Jonas Mekas
 N. B. Minkoff (1893–1958), Polish-born American Yiddish poet, newspaper editor, and educator
 Piet Mondrian
 Sidney Morgenbesser
 Lewis Mumford
 David Neiman (1921–2004), Russian-born American scholar in the fields of Biblical Studies and Jewish history
 Reinhold Niebuhr
 Claus Offe
 Frank O'Hara
 Elsie Clews Parsons
 Cipe Pineles
 Erwin Piscator
 Richard Plant (1910–1998), gay Jewish emigre from Nazi Germany, taught German language and literature 
 Eliezer Rafaeli (1926–2018), Israeli founding President of the University of Haifa
 Adolph L. Reed, Jr. (born 1947), professor emeritus of political science  
 Wilhelm Reich (1897–1957), Austrian doctor of medicine and a psychoanalyst
 Herman Rose, the professional pseudonym of Herman Rappaport (1909–2007), painter and artist
 Justus Rosenberg (1921–2021), Free City of Danzig-born literature professor 
 Bertrand Russell
 Paul Ryan
 Jeremy D. Safran (1952–2018), Canadian-born American clinical psychologist, psychoanalyst, lecturer, and psychotherapy researcher
 Albert Salomon (1891–1966), German-born American sociologist 
 Meyer Schapiro (1904–1996), Lithuanian-born American art historian 
 Alfred Schutz (1899–1959), Austrian philosopher and social phenomenologist
 Benjamin Shwadran (1907–2001), Mandatory Palestine-born Israeli author and professor of Middle Eastern studies
 Ali Shayegan (1903–1981), Iranian politician 
 Leo Strauss (1899–1973), German-American political philosopher and classicist 
 Sekou Sundiata
 Paul Sweezy
 G.M. Tamás
 Charles Tilly
 Thorstein Veblen
 Thomas Vietorisz
 Max Wertheimer (1880–1943), Austro-Hungarian psychologist 
 Frank Lloyd Wright (1867–1959), architect, designer, writer, and educator
Abraham Yahuda (1877-1951), Palestinian Jew, polymath, teacher, writer, researcher, linguist, and collector of rare documents
 Michael Zager
 Slavoj Žižek

Present
 Robert Antoni
 Andrew Arato
 Jonathan Bach
 Jay Bernstein
 Richard ("Dick") Bernstein
Jane Ira Bloom
 Susan Cheever
 Michael Cohen
Alice Crary
 Simon Critchley
 Siddhartha Deb
 Faisal Devji
 Robert Dunn
 Federico Finchelstein (born 1975), Argentine historian and chair of the history department at the New School
 Nancy Fraser
 Sakiko Fukuda-Parr
 Mary Gaitskill
 Paul Goldberger
 Elana Greenfield, playwright and short story writer
 Nina L. Khrushcheva
 Marcel Kinsbourne
 Ron Leibman
 David Levithan
 Arun Luthra
 Vladan Nikolic
 Pippin Parker
 Austin Pendleton
 Frank Pugliese
 John Reed
 Miguel Robles-Durán
 Anwar Shaikh
 Christopher Shinn
 Arthur Storch
 Rory Stuart
 Eugene Thacker
 Scott Thornbury
 McKenzie Wark
Maya Wiley
 Reggie Workman

Dorothy H. Hirshon Directors-in-Residence 

 2021: Sam Pollard
 2020: Mary Harron
 2019: Raoul Peck
 2018: Sean Baker
 2017: Jon Alpert and Keiko Tsuno
 2014: Toni Dove
 2013: Lynn Hershman Leeson and Benh Zeitlin
 2012: Ramin Bahrani
 2011: Guy Maddin
 2010: Haile Gerima
 2009: Jim Stark
 2008: Cynthia Wade
 2007: John Cameron Mitchell
 2005: Laurie Anderson
 2004: John Waters
 2003: D.A. Pennebaker and Chris Hegedus

References

The New School
The New School